Roland Gerebics (born 6 September 1979 in Várpalota) is a Hungarian sport shooter who specializes in the double trap.

At the 2000 Olympic Games he finished in fifth place. He then finished second at the 2001 and 2006 World Championships, and fourth at the 2006 European Championships.

At the 2008 Olympic Games he came in joint sixth place in the double trap qualification. Following a shoot-off he finished ninth, missing out on a place among the top six, who progressed to the final.

He resides in Sarlóspuszta.

References
Profile

1979 births
Living people
People from Várpalota
Hungarian male sport shooters
Shooters at the 2000 Summer Olympics
Shooters at the 2008 Summer Olympics
Olympic shooters of Hungary
Trap and double trap shooters
Shooters at the 2015 European Games
European Games competitors for Hungary
Sportspeople from Veszprém County
21st-century Hungarian people